James Jamerson Jr. (born James L. Jamerson III; August 24, 1957 – March 23, 2016) was an American bass player and noted studio musician. During his over three-decades long career he recorded with Bob Dylan, Tavares, The Temptations, and many more.

Life and career
Jamerson Jr. was born in Detroit to legendary session bass player James Jamerson, a cornerstone member of Motown's famed house band, The Funk Brothers.

In the early 1970s, Jamerson, Jr. became an in-demand session bassist. In the next three decades he played on the studio albums by Janet Jackson, Smokey Robinson, and Aretha Franklin, to name a few.

In the late 1970s, he formed a studio disco group, Chanson, along with guitarist David Williams. Their only charted single, "Don't Hold Back" reached No. 21 on the Billboard Hot 100 in 1979 and No. 18 in Canada.

Jamerson died in Detroit on March 23, 2016, at age 58. He had suffered for years with ankylosing spondylitis.

Selected discography

With Tavares
 Check It Out (1974)
With Sylvester
 Step II (1978)
With High Inergy
 Shoulda Gone Dancin' (1979)
With The Crusaders with B.B. King and the Royal Philharmonic Orchestra
 Royal Jam (1981)
With Janet Jackson
 Janet Jackson (1982)
With DeBarge
 In a Special Way (1983)
With Smokey Robinson
 Touch the Sky (1983)
With Teena Marie
 Starchild (1984)
With The Temptations
 Truly for You (1984)
With Philip Bailey
 The Wonders of His Love (1985)
With Bob Dylan
 Knocked Out Loaded (1986)
With Aretha Franklin
 Aretha (1986)
With Wayne Kramer
 The Hard Stuff (1995)

References

External links

 
 

1957 births
2016 deaths
20th-century American bass guitarists
20th-century American male musicians
21st-century American bass guitarists
21st-century American male musicians
African-American guitarists
American session musicians
Deaths from arthritis
Musicians from Detroit
American rhythm and blues bass guitarists
American male bass guitarists
20th-century African-American musicians
21st-century African-American musicians